Lucie Laurier (born 19 March 1975) is a Canadian actress from Quebec. She is most noted for her performances in the films Anne Trister, for which she received a Genie Award nomination for Best Supporting Actress at the 8th Genie Awards in 1987, and Bon Cop, Bad Cop, for which she received a Jutra Award nomination for Best Supporting Actress at the 9th Jutra Awards in 2007.

Filmography 
 1985 : Le Vieillard et l'enfant
 1986 : Henri : Liliane
 1986 : Anne Trister : Sarah
 1987 : Le diable à quatre
 1989 : Chambres en ville (television series) : Caroline #1
 1990 : Les Filles de Caleb (television series) : Émilie (jeune)
 1991 : Love-moi : Danielle
 1994 : Chili's Blues (C'était le 12 du 12 et Chili avait les blues) : Chili
 1995 : Black List (Liste noire) : Valérie Savard
 1996 : Love Me, Love Me Not (J'aime, j'aime pas) : Winnifred
 1996 : Tarzan :(television series) :  Blanche Dubois
 1997 : Strip Search : Billy
 1997 : Contrat sur un terroriste (The Assignment) : Paris Lover
 1999 : Mumford : Pretty Coed
 2001 : Stiletto Dance (TV movie) : Lena
 2001 : Second Coming :  Katja
 2001 : Don't Say a Word : Vanessa
 2003 : Jean Moulin, une affaire française (television series) : Colette Jacques
 2003 : How My Mother Gave Birth to Me During Menopause (Comment ma mère accoucha de moi durant sa ménopause) : Cassandre
 2003 : Seducing Doctor Lewis (La Grande séduction) : Ève Beauchemin
 2003 : Virginie (television series) : Karine Constantin" (2003–2005)
 2004 : Fortier V (television series) :  Sagash
 2004 : Cauchemar d'amour (television series) :  Taille 0
 2004 : Caméra café (television series)
 2004 : C'est pas moi, c'est l'autre
 2005 : Les Invincibles (television series) : Jolène
 2005 : Trudeau II: Maverick in the Making (feuilleton TV) : Suzette Trudeau
 2005 : Masters of Horror: Chocolate (television series) : Catherine Duprés
 2006 : À part des autres : Margot
 2006 : François en série (television series) :  Émilie
 2006 : René (television series) :  Corinne Coté-Lévesque
 2006 : Bon Cop, Bad Cop : Suzie
 2007 : Nitro : Morgane
 2013 : The Dismantling (Le Démantèlement)
 2017 : Bon Cop, Bad Cop 2 : Suzie
 2019: Mont Foster

References

External links
 
  Official Website 

French Quebecers
People from Longueuil
1975 births
Living people
Canadian film actresses
Canadian television actresses
Actresses from Quebec